This page details football records in the Northern Ireland.

League

Team records

Titles
Most top-flight league titles: 56, Linfield
Most consecutive league titles:  6, joint record:
 Belfast Celtic (1935–36 to 1947–48, league suspended from 1940 to 1947)
 Linfield (1981–82 to 1986–87)

Top-flight Appearances
Most seasons in the top flight: 121, joint record:
Cliftonville (1890–present)
 Glentoran (1890–present)
 Linfield (1890–present)

Overall top flight League Table (since 2008)
The overall top flight League table is a cumulative record of all match results, points and goals of every team that has played in the 14 completed seasons of the top flight in its current format - namely the IFA/NIFL Premiership since its inception in the 2008–09 season. Teams in bold are part of the 2022–23  season. Numbers in bold are the record numbers in each column.

 All seasons were played over 38 games, except the 2019–20 season which was played over 31 games due to the COVID-19 pandemic in Northern Ireland.

League or status:

Irish Cup
Most wins: 44, Linfield

Most consecutive wins: 4, Glentoran (1985, 1986, 1987 & 1988)

Most appearances in a final: 64, Linfield

Most consecutive appearances in a final: 5, Linfield (1891, 1892, 1893, 1894 & 1895)

Most defeats in a final: 21, Linfield

Most consecutive defeats in a final: 3, Linfield (1975, 1976 & 1977)

Biggest win in a final: Linfield 10–1 Bohemians (1895)

Longest gap between wins in a final: 70 years, Cliftonville (1909 and 1979)

Longest gap between appearances in a final: 55 years, Bangor (1938 and 1993)

Most appearances in a final without winning: 6, Larne (1928, 1935, 1987, 1989, 2005 & 2021)

Most common pair of finalists: Glentoran v Linfield – 15 times (1899, 1913, 1914, 1916, 1919, 1923, 1932, 1942, 1945, 1966, 1973, 1983, 1985, 2001 & 2006)

League Cup
Most wins: 10, Linfield

Most consecutive wins: 4, Cliftonville (2012–13, 2013–14, 2014–15 & 2015–16)

Most final appearances: 12, joint record:
Glentoran
Linfield

Most consecutive final appearances: 4, Cliftonville (2012–13, 2013–14, 2014–15 & 2015–16)

Most final defeats: 6, Crusaders (1986–87, 1995–96, 2007–08, 2012–13, 2013–14 & 2019–20)

Most consecutive final defeats: 3, Glentoran (1996–97, 1997–98 & 1998–99)

Biggest final winning margin: 4–0, joint record:
Linfield 4–0 Coleraine (1999–2000)
Cliftonville 4–0 Crusaders (2012–13)

Longest gap between wins: 15 years, Crusaders (1996–97 and 2011–12)

Longest gap between final appearances: 21 years, Ards (1994–95 and 2015–16)

Most final appearances without winning: 2, joint record:
Larne (1991–92 & 2003–04)
Newry City (1989–90 and 2008–09)

Most common final: Glentoran v Linfield (7 times)

Total titles won

Notes

Northern Ireland
Association football in Northern Ireland